The American College Counseling Association (ACCA) is a division of the American Counseling Association (ACA) for individuals whose professional identity is in counseling, whose work setting is higher education, and whose purpose is fostering students’ development.

The dual focus on a professional identity and on student development as a foundation for college counseling is a distinctive characteristic of the association.  From its founding, ACCA has sought to include professionals across various areas who provide services to colleges and universities, and because of its commitment to student development, has involved graduate students in significant ways including representation and leadership.  ACCA also has a strong commitment to diversity and social justice.

ACCA's members work in higher education settings including colleges, universities, and community and technical colleges. ACCA strives to support and enhance the practice of college counseling, to promote ethical and responsible professional practice, to promote communication and exchange among college counselors across service areas and institutional settings, to encourage cooperation with other organizations related to higher education and college student development, and to provide leadership and advocacy for the profession of counseling in higher education.

ACCA was created in 1991, in response to the disaffiliation of the American College Personnel Association (ACPA), to ensure a continued place within ACA (then American Association for Counseling and Development) for those working in colleges and universities.  ACPA’s decision reflected the “intent to serve those with a primary identity in student affairs. Consequently, individuals working in higher education who had a primary professional identity in counseling had to reevaluate their professional affiliations” (Davis, 1998, p. 7).  Gene Meadows served as the first president of ACCA, and membership had grown to approximately 2000 in that time.

Since its inception, ACCA has grown into a strong and active organization.  Visions, the organization’s newsletter, is published three times per year and is now disseminated electronically.  The Journal of College Counseling was initiated in 1998 and has developed a strong reputation as a scholarly journal, with an orientation to the work of practitioners.  The ACCA-L listserv, open to anyone interested in college counseling, provides an electronic forum for discussion of issues. Since 2002, ACCA has also sponsored a biennial national conference, co-hosted with one of its state divisions, in addition to its annual business meeting and other activities held at the ACA conference.  Other professional development opportunities include 23 state divisions, public policy and legislation activities, on-line courses providing continuing professional education, research grants, professional awards, and emerging leader grants to support graduate student participation at ACA and ACCA conferences.

One of the major, sustained initiatives within ACCA has been advocacy for college counseling  ACCA in 2001 published the second edition of the College Counseling Advocacy Booklet to support members in their advocacy efforts in response to the trends of outsourcing and budget constraints within higher education and the need to educate the general public, students, parents, and administrators about the value of counseling services on college campuses.  As an association, ACCA also advocates actively for professional standards and accreditation.

References
ACCA archives:  National Student Affairs Archives, Bowling Green State University, https://web.archive.org/web/20070606210439/http://www.bgsu.edu/colleges/library/cac/nsaaintro.html 
ACCA website:  www.collegecounseling.org
Davis, D. C., & Humphrey, K. M. (Eds.).  (2000).  College counseling:  Issues and strategies for a new millennium.  Alexandria, VA:  American Counseling Association.
Davis, D. C.  (1998).  The American College Counseling Association:  A historical view.  Journal of College Counseling, 1(1), 7-9.
Dean, L. A., & Meadows, M. E.  (1995). College counseling:  Union and intersection.  Journal of Counseling & Development, 74, 139-142.

Academic organizations based in the United States
Education-related professional associations
Mental health organizations in Virginia
1991 establishments in the United States
Organizations established in 1991